Rhodoscirpus is a monotypic genus of flowering plants belonging to the family Cyperaceae. The only species is Rhodoscirpus asper. It was reclassified from the previous Scirpus asper.

Its native range is Peru to Argentina.

References

Cyperaceae
Cyperaceae genera
Monotypic Poales genera